Margit Bach (born 25 March 1951) is a German hurdler. She competed in the women's 100 metres hurdles at the 1972 Summer Olympics, representing West Germany.

References

1951 births
Living people
Athletes (track and field) at the 1972 Summer Olympics
German female hurdlers
Olympic athletes of West Germany
Sportspeople from Frankfurt